Famaillá Department may refer to:

Famaillá Department, Tucumán, Argentina
Famatina Department, Argentina